"Love Poem" is a song by South Korean singer-songwriter IU, released by Kakao M as the lead single from her seventh Korean-language EP Love Poem on November 1, 2019. It debuted at number 11 on the Gaon Digital Chart before topping the chart the following week, becoming IU's 21st number-one single in South Korea, and extending her record for the most number ones on the chart.

Background and composition 
IU wrote the ballad to support loved ones who are going through hard times, saying: "It is difficult to see the person you love is becoming isolated. It is painful not doing anything for that situation and just watching over it."

"Love Poem" was written by IU and Lee Jong-hoon. Tamar Herman of Billboard described it as "a poignant, inspiring ballad full of warmth and comfort".

Critical reception
Writing for The Straits Times, Jan Lee commented that the song "feels particularly poignant given that IU lost one of her close friends, K-pop star Sulli, to a suspected suicide last month".

Accolades

Charts

Weekly charts

Year-end charts

Certifications

Release history

See also
List of Gaon Digital Chart number ones of 2019
List of Kpop Hot 100 number ones

References

2019 singles
2019 songs
Gaon Digital Chart number-one singles
IU (singer) songs
Korean-language songs
Kakao M singles
Billboard Korea K-Pop number-one singles
Songs written by IU (singer)